Anna Figura (born 6 February 1990) is a Polish ski mountaineer.

Figura is born in Zakopane, and studies forestry at the University of Krakow. She is member of the Klub Skialpinistyczny Kandahar. Her sister Paulina is also a competition ski mountaineer.

Selected results 
 2011:
 4th, World Championship, relay, together with Julia Wajda and Klaudia Tasz
 7th, World Championship, sprint
 10th, World Championship, team, together with Julia Wajda
 2012:
 3rd, European Championship, sprint
 4th, European Championship, combined ranking
 5th, European Championship, team, together with Klaudia Tasz
 6th, European Championship, relay, together with Anna Tybor and Julia Wajda
 9th, European Championship, individual

References 

1990 births
Living people
Polish female ski mountaineers
Sportspeople from Zakopane
21st-century Polish women